The 1920 Maine gubernatorial election took place on September 13, 1920.

Incumbent Governor Carl Milliken was defeated in the Republican primary.

Republican candidate Frederic Hale Parkhurst defeated Democratic candidate Bertrand G. McIntire.

Results

Parkhurst died just 26 days in office following a months long illness, which started when he was Governor-elect.

Notes

References

Gubernatorial
1920
Maine
September 1920 events